The Iowa River is a tributary of the Mississippi River in the state of Iowa in the United States. Its major tributary is the Cedar River.

Course

The Iowa then proceeds roughly in a southeast direction, passing through the city of Iowa Falls, through a scenic valley to Steamboat Rock, then through the cities of Eldora, Marshalltown, Tama, and Marengo, and through the Amana Colonies in Iowa County. In Johnson County, it becomes impounded by the Coralville Dam in the Coralville Reservoir, which turns southward to the spillway. The river runs generally south and passes through Iowa City and the University of Iowa campus. A lowhead dam at Burlington Street in Iowa City is the last dam before the river's confluence with the Mississippi. South of Iowa City, it is joined in Washington County by the English River, and then in Louisa County it is joined by the Cedar River to flow into the Mississippi.

Uses
The Iowa River is noted for recreational and commercial fishing. Game fish include largemouth and smallmouth bass, walleye, northern pike, channel and flathead catfish, crappie and other panfish. The Coralville Reservoir is commercially fished for carp and buffalo fish.

Pine Lake State Park is located on the Iowa River at Eldora.

Floods
The Iowa can flood, notably in the June 2008 Midwest floods, and the Great Flood of 1993. The Cedar and its tributaries, including the Shell Rock River, can contribute to flooding events.
It tore down the historical swinging bridge in Charles City, Iowa.

August 2022 jawbone discovery
On the afternoon of August 8, 2022, Marshall County Conservation staff discovered a jawbone from a prehistoric Native American of middle age or older in the Iowa River in Marshall County.

See also
Homer D. Calkins
List of rivers of Iowa

References

External links

Rivers of Iowa
Tributaries of the Mississippi River
Rivers of Hancock County, Iowa
Rivers of Iowa County, Iowa
Rivers of Johnson County, Iowa
Rivers of Hardin County, Iowa
Rivers of Marshall County, Iowa
Rivers of Tama County, Iowa
Mississippi River watershed